The 1963 Southern Miss Southerners football team was an American football team that represented the University of Southern Mississippi as an independent during the 1963 NCAA University Division football season. In their fifteenth year under head coach Thad Vann, the team compiled a 5–3–1 record.

Schedule

References

Southern Miss
Southern Miss Golden Eagles football seasons
Southern Miss Southerners football